"Strong" is a song by British indie pop group London Grammar. The song was released as a digital download in the United Kingdom on 1 September 2013. The song peaked at number sixteen on the UK Singles Chart, making it their highest-charting single in the UK to-date. Outside the United Kingdom, "Strong" peaked within the top ten of the charts in Australia, with sales and airplay from both the original version and High Contrast remix.

Music video
The music video for "Strong" was first released on YouTube on 26 July 2013 at a total length of four minutes and two seconds. The video, directed by Sam Brown and produced by Rogue Films, was shot on location at the 6th Street Viaduct in Los Angeles with the actor Nash Edgerton and Savannah Young. As of April 2021, it has over 52 million views on YouTube.

Track listing

Charts and certifications

Weekly charts

Year-end charts

Certifications

Release history

References

2013 singles
2013 songs
London Grammar songs
Rock ballads
Songs written by Dan Rothman
Songs written by Dominic Major
Songs written by Hannah Reid
Synth-pop songs